The Soul Album is the fourth studio album by American soul singer-songwriter Otis Redding, released in 1966. It features Redding performing songs that he co-wrote, as well as covers of songs by such musicians as Sam Cooke, Eddie Floyd, Roy Head, and Smokey Robinson. Guitarist Steve Cropper contributed guitar on the album, and is also credited as the co-author of three tracks.

The Soul Album entered the Billboard LP charts upon its release in April 1966, and made the Hot 100 chart in June. The album peaked at number 54 in July, and remained among the 100 best-selling albums until autumn. It spent 28 weeks on the US R&B albums chart, peaking at number 3, and reached number 58 on the US pop and rock charts.

Cover art
The cover of The Soul Album was designed by Loring Eutemey of Atlantic Records. According to author Jonathan Gould, the album's cover photo "drew a stark contrast with the racial obfuscation of Otis Blue [Redding's previous album] by presenting a full-color portrait of a strikingly beautiful African American model wearing a head scarf and a coy half-smile, her warm brown eyes staring directly into the lens."

Critical reception

Bruce Eder of AllMusic gave the album a positive review, writing that it "shows [Redding] moving from strength to strength in a string of high-energy, sweaty soul performances, interspersing his own songs with work by Sam Cooke ("Chain Gang"), Roy Head ("Treat Her Right"), Eddie Floyd ("Everybody Makes a Mistake"), and Smokey Robinson ("It's Growing") and recasting them in his own style, so that they're not 'covers' so much as reinterpretations [...]". Eder also refers to the track "Cigarettes and Coffee" as "the jewel of this undervalued collection".

Track listing

Personnel
Otis Redding – vocals
Booker T. Jones, Isaac Hayes – keyboards, piano
Steve Cropper – guitar
Donald Dunn – bass guitar
Al Jackson Jr. – drums
Wayne Jackson, Sammy Coleman, Gene "Bowlegs" Miller – trumpet
Charles "Packy" Axton, Andrew Love – tenor saxophone
Floyd Newman – baritone saxophone

References

1966 albums
Otis Redding albums
Stax Records albums
Atco Records albums
Albums produced by Jim Stewart (record producer)
Albums produced by Isaac Hayes
Albums produced by David Porter (musician)